Tyson George Gordon (born 31 January 1982) is a Jamaican-born Canadian cricket player.  Gordon is left-handed batsman who bowls right-arm fast-medium, and who currently plays international cricket for Canada. He was born in Saint Mary, Jamaica.

Gordon played a single List A match for his native Jamaica against the touring South Africans in May 2005.  In his maiden List A match he scored 70 runs before being dismissed by Shaun Pollock.  This was the highest score in the Jamaican innings.  He later moved to Canada and made his senior debut for Canada against Trinidad and Tobago in the 2010 Caribbean Twenty20.  Gordon played in the following season's competition, playing all of Canada's fixtures in the tournament.  Tyson was selected as part of Canada's 2011 ICC Cricket World Cup squad, having only qualified to play international cricket days before the tournament.

Gordon made his One Day International and List A debut for Canada against Sri Lanka at the Mahinda Rajapaksa International Stadium.  Gordon made 4 runs from 10 balls in the match, being dismissed by Nuwan Kulasekara.  This set the picture for a disappointing tournament with the bat for Gordon, with his average after four ODI's just 5.75.

References

External links
Tyson Gordon at ESPNcricinfo
Tyson Gordon at CricketArchive

1982 births
Living people
People from Saint Mary Parish, Jamaica
Jamaican emigrants to Canada
Jamaican cricketers
Canadian cricketers
Canada One Day International cricketers
Canada Twenty20 International cricketers
Cricketers at the 2011 Cricket World Cup
Jamaica cricketers